Lycée Nelson Mandela may refer to: 

 Lycée Nelson Mandela (Nantes)
 Lycée Nelson Mandela (Poitiers)